The Bologna metropolitan railway service (Italian: servizio ferroviario metropolitano di Bologna, acronym: SFMBO) is a commuter railway service around the Italian city of Bologna. It is currently under construction.

History 
Launched in 1995 with two suburban lines attested in the Bologna Centrale Railway Station, with the agreement of the program of 2007 is expected activation of more straight lines with a regular timetable for 2012, but due to delays in the full activation Bologna Central station AV completion buoyancy base is postponed to 2015. in June 2013 have been completed on 90% of the infrastructure works and are active 70% of the services provided positioned in the base.

Lines 
The following 8 lines are foreseen:

  Bologna Centrale–Porretta Terme
  Bologna Centrale–San Benedetto Sambro-Castiglione Pepoli
  Bologna Centrale–Vignola
  Bologna Centrale–Portomaggiore
  Bologna Centrale–Poggio Rusco
  Bologna Centrale–Ferrara
  Bologna Centrale–Imola
  Bologna Centrale–Modena

See also 
 List of suburban and commuter rail systems
 List of Bologna metro stations

References

External links 

 Official page

Metropolitan Railway Service
Passenger rail transport in Italy
Proposed rail infrastructure in Italy